WQII (1140 AM) is a radio station broadcasting a Talk/Personality format. Licensed to San Juan, Puerto Rico, it serves the Puerto Rico area. The station is currently owned by Communications Counsel Group.

11Q TV

11Q TV is an online-video streaming service, owned by 11Q Radio. 11Q TV broadcasts local programming, that includes: news, sports, lifestyle & community service programs, from its studios in San Juan. 11Q TV consists of both a 24-hour linear streaming channel and on-demand programming from 11Q 1140 AM. 11Q TV is available on the station's website: www.11qradio.com.

Programs

 Las Mañanas con Joel Rivera
 Crudo y sin Editar
 Solaprenurs

External links
FCC History Cards for WQII

QII
Radio stations established in 1948
1948 establishments in Puerto Rico
QII